Karan-Yelga (Qaranyılğa) is a rural locality (a village) in Saitbabinsky Selsoviet, Gafuriysky District, Bashkortostan, Russia. The population was 265 as of 2010. There are 8 streets.

Geography 
Karan-Yelga is located 39 km northeast of Krasnousolsky (the district's administrative centre) by road. Saitbaba is the nearest rural locality.

References 

Rural localities in Gafuriysky District
Sterlitamaksky Uyezd